The Power of Buddhism is a 1999 book written by Tenzin Gyatso, 14th Dalai Lama and Jean-Claude Carrière, published 1 January 1996.

References

External links

Books by the 14th Dalai Lama
1999 non-fiction books